The following programs are distributed by Keshet International.

Comedy
Arab Labor (Avoda Aravit)
The Baker and the Beauty (Lihiot ita)
Bobby & Me
Easy Money
Fox Force
Honey Africa
House Arrest
Military Base 22
Mother’s Day (Yom Haem)
Polishuk
Traffic Light (Ramzor)
Your Family or Mine (Savri Maranan)

Drama
The A Word (Pilpelim Tsehubim)
Custody
Devout Love
Dig
Hit and Run
Light and Truth
Loaded (Mesudarim)
Mice
Musical High
Mythological Ex
Prisoners of War (Hatufim)

Entertainment
Babe Magnet
The Big Ten
Face2Face
Master Class (Bit sefer lemuzika)
Not a Star Yet
Play/Record
Rising Star (HaKokhav HaBa)
Rising Star (U.S.)
The Successor
What a Wonderful Country (Eretz Nehederet)
You Must be Joking

Factual entertainment
Dear Neighbors
Fair & Square
The Recipe 
Remember Me?
Six Lessons On...
The Ten Commandments

We’ll Always be Mom & Dad
What’s This Bullshit?!
Whose Closet is it Anyway?

Game shows
50 Things you Have to Know
All Together Now
Boom!
Checkout
Clockwise
Deal with It!
Heaven or Hell
Honey, Please!
The Late Night Game Show
Mind Games
Pick a Pocket 
Sure or Insure
The Vault

Reality
The E Team
Girlfri3nds
Help! I Can’t Cook
Love
Love Lab
Marathon
Simon
Undercover Chef

References

Israeli television shows
Keshet International